is a 2017 Japanese drama film directed by Kazuya Shiraishi. It was screened in the Contemporary World Cinema section at the 2017 Toronto International Film Festival.

Plot
Towako leads an idle life alongside Jinji Sano, in his fifties, a man about fifteen her senior, whom she despises and belittles at the slightest opportunity. The latter endures her remonstrances without flinching and alone provides for the needs of the household through hard work as a blue-collar worker. Towako takes Makoto Mizushima as her lover, but lives in the painful memory of her relationship with Shun'ichi Kurosaki which ended abruptly eight years earlier. One day she dials Kurosaki's number but hangs up immediately. Following this phone call, a police inspector visits her and tells her that Kurosaki disappeared without a trace five years ago. When Towako catches Jinji spying on her as she walks out of a love hotel with her lover, she begins to suspect that Jinji is responsible for Kurosaki's disappearance.

Cast
 Yū Aoi as Towako Kitahara
 Sadao Abe as Jinji Sano
 Yutaka Takenouchi as Shunichi Kurosaki
 Tori Matsuzaka as Makoto Mizushima
 Eri Murakawa as Kayo Kunieda
 Shu Nakajima as Kunieda

About the film
Birds Without Names is an adaptation of the successful novel of the same name by Mahokaru Numata whose writings often feature manipulative men, brutal women and their toxic relationships. Another adaptation of one of his novels, Yurigokoro (ユリゴコロ?) By Naoto Kumazawa, was released a month earlier in Japan.

The film is set in and around Osaka, the actors speak with a strong Kansai dialect.

References

External links
  
 

2017 films
2017 drama films
Japanese drama films
2010s Japanese-language films
Films directed by Kazuya Shiraishi
2010s Japanese films